Christa Klecker was an Austrian luger who competed in the late 1920s. She won a silver medal in the women's singles event at the 1929 European luge championships in Semmering, Austria.

References
List of European luge champions 

Austrian female lugers
Year of birth missing
Year of death missing
20th-century Austrian women